Martin Luther is a 1953 American–West German film biography of Martin Luther. It was directed by Irving Pichel, (who also plays a supporting role), and stars Niall MacGinnis as Luther. It was produced by Louis de Rochemont and RD-DR Corporation in collaboration with Lutheran Church Productions and Luther-Film-G.M.B.H.

The National Board of Review named the film the fourth best of 1953. It was nominated for two Oscars, for Best Cinematography (Black-and-White) (Joseph C. Brun) and Art Direction/Set Decoration (Black-and-White) (Fritz Maurischat, Paul Markwitz). The music was composed by Mark Lothar and performed by the Munich Philharmonic Orchestra. It was filmed at the Wiesbaden Studios in Hesse in West Germany.

A notice at the beginning of the film characterizes it as a careful and balanced presentation of Luther's story: "This dramatization of a decisive moment in human history is the result of careful research of facts and conditions in the 16th century as reported by historians of many faiths." The research was done by notable Reformation scholars Theodore G. Tappert and Jaroslav Pelikan who assisted Allan Sloane and Lothar Wolff.

The film was commercially very successful.

Summary 

The time frame of the film is 1505–1530: Luther's entrance into St. Augustine's Monastery in Erfurt to the presentation of the Augsburg Confession. It recounts Martin Luther's struggle to find God's mercy: his discovery of the gospel in Romans 1:17, the posting of the Ninety-five theses, and the subsequent controversy, which led to Luther's being separated from the church of Rome. It shows Luther's resistance to the forces of radicalism, and his work to establish and maintain the evangelical movement of his day. The dramatic climax of the film is Luther's "Here I Stand" speech before the 1521 Diet of Worms, and the grand finale is the singing of "A Mighty Fortress Is Our God" by Luther's congregation.

Plot 

Narrator John Wiggin begins the film with a scholarly overview of the place and time of the life of Martin Luther. He points out that power is divided between the Emperor of the Holy Roman Empire and the Roman Catholic Church. To set the stage for the presentation of Luther's conflict with the church of his day he states, "the church had largely forgotten the mercies of God and, instead, it emphasized God's implacable judgments."

Since he will soon be entering St. Augustine's Monastery, Martin Luther holds a "going away" party at a local pub with his fellow law students. Conspicuous among his guests is George Spalatin, who provides an inquiring interest into Luther's motivation to leave the study of law. Luther's entrance into monastic life is then portrayed. He does not find the spiritual peace he sought even though he follows a strict regimen of ascetic piety to the point of flagellating himself half to death. He is shown in sheer terror at the celebration of his first Mass as a newly ordained priest. After he struggles through his first Mass he confesses to his mentor, Vicar General Johann von Staupitz that he cannot love God. Subsequently, the dour-faced prior proposes expelling Luther from the order because of his restless mind, but Staupitz believes that rigorous theological study and a pilgrimage embassy to Rome will help the troubled young monk.

After he had returned from Rome, just after completing a prayer office, Luther expresses his opinion to his fellow monks that the common people could more easily find God to be merciful if they had the Holy Scriptures in their vernacular language. He is then confronted and scolded by his stern prior. Then while studying in the Erfurt university library Luther is met by George Spalatin, who had also left the study of the law for a vocation in the church: in his case to serve Frederick III, Elector of Saxony. Spalatin renews his interest in Luther's quest, "Have you found what you were looking for?" Luther responds, "Not yet." Spalatin then recommends Luther to the Elector as a preacher at the castle church and professor of Biblical studies at the newly founded University of Wittenberg. Luther is then shown baptizing an infant in the castle church.

At Wittenberg, Luther receives his degree of Doctor of Theology when he promises to be a faithful teacher in the church; however, he has difficulty in accepting the practice even there in Wittenberg of collecting and showcasing relics. The film presents Luther as having undergone his "reformatory discovery" through his study of the Epistle to the Romans for his lectures on this Biblical book. He tells his mentor Staupitz that one only need have faith in Jesus Christ for salvation. Staupitz leaves unpersuaded, but Luther writes the word "sola" (alone) in the margin of his Latin Bible to show his firm persuasion in the doctrine of justification by faith alone.

A few years go by. It is now 1517, and in Rome Pope Leo X arranges with Archbishop Albert to promulgate in Germany a special jubilee indulgence. Johann Tetzel is the main preacher of this indulgence, and his pitch is presented in public with the beating of drums. That same evening Martin Luther comes across one of his parishioners in a drunken stupor with the conviction that he does not need to go to confession anymore because he has bought one of Tetzel's indulgences. Luther then preaches against what he believes to be the abuse of indulgences with the appeal, "Beloved, you cannot buy God's mercy." He then also posts his The Ninety-Five Theses on the door of the castle church, which does not seem to arouse any attention until his theses are copied down, translated, and printed for all of Germany to read, hear, and comment about. Tetzel finds that his sales of indulgences have fallen off, which moves Archbishop Albert of Mainz to send a copy of Luther's theses to the pope.

In 1519 Andreas Karlstadt tells Luther and newly installed professor Philipp Melanchthon of his being invited to Leipzig to debate what he calls "our theses." To Karlstadt's disappointment Luther invites himself and Melanchthon along. When they arrive in Leipzig, they see that there is a movement afoot to link Luther with Jan Hus in order to brand him as a heretic. Luther debates Johann Eck, who shouts, "Heresy, Dr. Luther, Heresy!" with Luther responding, "So be it! It is still the truth!" After the debate at which he was present Staupitz releases Luther from his vows as an Augustinian monk when Luther refuses to stop promoting his doctrine.

The pope is furious with Luther's publications of 1520 (On the Babylonian Captivity of the Church, To the Christian Nobility of the German Nation, and On the Freedom of a Christian), so he issues his bull Exsurge Domine threatening Luther with excommunication. It too is disseminated in as public a manner as Luther's Ninety-five Theses, but Luther responds by burning it on the deadline demanded for his retraction. Cardinal Aleander goes to Elector Frederick to demand that he hand Luther over to the pope. It is there that the film has him meet Desiderius Erasmus, who seems to trivialize the matter. The Elector says that Luther will appear at the upcoming Diet of Worms.

At Worms Luther is surprised by the procedure instigated by Aleander of simply asking him if he acknowledges his printed writings and whether he is willing to retract any of his assertions in those writings. Luther asks for time and is given until the next day. Then he gives his answer that he will not recant, ending with, "Here I stand. I can do no other. God help me. Amen." Emperor Charles V angrily promulgates his Edict of Worms outlawing Luther and giving him twenty-one days to return to Wittenberg. Elector Frederick, spurned by the emperor, has Luther quietly abducted to his stronghold of the Wartburg near Eisenach where for almost a year Luther stays in hiding. It is here that he translates the New Testament into German. He has a retainer of the Elector read a portion of John 6 to show that "a German lark can sing as sweetly as any Greek or Latin nightingale."

Luther's exile is brought to a close with Karlstadt's revolutionary uprising in Wittenberg and the Electorate of Saxony, which causes churches to be desecrated. Luther preaches his "how dare you" (Invocavit) sermons to restore order to his troubled congregation. In the course of the film, Luther is shown marrying a former nun Katharina von Bora to the delight of his father, who is shown attending the wedding. Luther and Kathie's family room is the scene of Luther holding instructions from his catechism. He is dismayed that he cannot join his fellow reformers in Augsburg as they appear before the diet there in 1530. There the Augsburg Confession is courageously presented to the emperor followed in the film by the pealing of bells, and Luther offering a prayer of thanksgiving to God for his faithfulness to his generation. The film ends with the people of his congregation, young and old, rich and poor alike, singing to him his hymn "A Mighty Fortress Is Our God" in its isometric tune.

Cast

Historical inconsistencies

Pope Julius II is represented as being in Rome when Luther was there when, in reality, he was not.
Tetzel is represented as saying that no confession was necessary when one bought the indulgences he was selling when, in reality, the indulgences specified that the buyer was to go to confession if he had bought the indulgence for himself.
Luther's 1520 treatises are represented as having been in print by June 15, 1520 when Exsurge Domine was issued when, in reality, they had not.
Luther is represented as telling Karlstadt to leave Wittenberg in 1522 when, in reality, Luther pleaded with him in Orlamünde to return after Karlstadt had voluntarily left.
Luther is represented as being at home in Wittenberg during the Diet of Augsburg in 1530 when, in reality, he was staying in Coburg.
The isometric form of "A Mighty Fortress Is Our God" did not exist in Luther's time; It was a product of the later Pietistic movement which found fault with early rhythmic chorale melodies because their dance-like rhythms were too secular in nature.

Reception
The film received positive reviews from critics. Bosley Crowther of The New York Times praised the film as "a brilliant demonstration of strongly disciplined emotions and intellects," with dialogue "done with such forceful delivery and in such well-staged and well-assembled scenes that it commands intelligent attention and stimulates the mind." Variety wrote: "An artistic achievement of its kind, reflecting careful research and preparation, boasting a magnificent performance by Niall MacGinnis, of London's Old Vic, in the title role, and given reverential, straightforward, honest, sincere treatment, as well as eschewing anything savoring of sensationalism, it is well calculated to stir the enthusiasm of Lutheran and Protestant ministers along with the more devoted laity." Harrison's Reports called the picture "tops" and thought the entire cast did "superb work." John McCarten of The New Yorker wrote that every player in the cast "commands attention," and thought that the documentary-like film techniques were used "to good advantage." The Monthly Film Bulletin found the film increasingly "tedious" as there was "no dramatic structure as such," but nonetheless concluded, "That the film was made at all, however, and that its honesty and truth hold their own for so long, is as remarkable as creditable."

Censorship
The film failed to be approved by Quebec's film censorship board, which was made up entirely of French-speaking Catholics, because Luther's radical teachings remained as heretical in 1953 as they were in the 16th century, and thus was never released in Quebec's movie theaters; it could be seen there only in the basements of Protestant churches.

References

External links 

1953 films
American drama films
1953 drama films
Films about Martin Luther
Films directed by Irving Pichel
American black-and-white films
1950s English-language films
1950s American films